Steve Caballero (born November 8, 1964) is an American professional skateboarder. He is known for the difficult tricks and air variations he invented for vertical skating and for setting the long-standing record for the highest air achieved on a halfpipe. In 1999, Thrasher Magazine named Caballero the "Skater of the Century".

Career

Caballero was born with scoliosis, a condition which causes a curvature of the spine, although he has stated that the condition "really hasn't affected me too much."

He began skating in 1976 at the age of 12 and started his career at age 14. His first sponsor was Campbell Skate Park. 
In 1979, Caballero entered a national skate contest in Escondido. After finishing fifth place, he was approached by Stacy Peralta who offered him sponsorship with Powell Peralta.  He turned pro in 1980 during the Gold Cup series at the Oasis Skatepark, Southern California. By this time, Caballero had invented the 'Caballerial' (also known as 'Cab'), a skateboarding trick also known as the fakie 360 aerial. Caballero is also credited with inventing the frontside boardslide.

In 1987, Caballero won both street and vert titles at the World Championships in Münster, Germany. The same year, on September 7, 1987, he set the world record for highest air achieved on a half-pipe by successfully executing an eleven-foot backside air at the Raging Waters Ramp in San Jose, California. Caballero's record was later beaten by Danny Way in 1997. In 1999, Caballero set another record for the longest board slide on a 44 step handrail.

Caballero is a member of the Bones Brigade, and has appeared in many of their videos, including The Search for Animal Chin. His current sponsors include Powell Peralta, Bones Bearings, Independent Truck Company, Bones Wheels, Vans Skate Shoes, 187 killer pads, Merge4 socks,  and Protec Helmets. His past sponsors included Tracker Trucks, Standard Trucks, and Red Dragon Apparel.

During the first half of the 1980s, Caballero was arguably the best professional skater and featured on the cover of Thrasher Magazine several times. He also features as a character in five of the Tony Hawk video games, from Tony Hawk's Pro Skater 2 to Tony Hawk's Underground, and as a downloadable skater in Tony Hawk's Pro Skater HD.

Caballero featured in Stacy Peralta's 2012 documentary film, Bones Brigade: An Autobiography, which chronicles the life stories of members of the Bones Brigade skate team such as Tony Hawk, Rodney Mullen, Mike McGill, Lance Mountain and Tommy Guerrero.

Other projects
He has been a member of several punk bands including The Faction, Odd Man Out, Shovelhead, and Soda, and released a compilation CD of the various bands he has appeared in, titled Bandology, through Sessions Records. The Faction's song "Skate And Destroy" featured on the soundtrack of Powell Peralta's eponymous Bones Brigade Video Show. He also had an acting role as Juan in the 1984 Jimmy McNichol action movie Escape from El Diablo, together with fellow skateboarder Mike McGill.  In the 1980s, Caballero published a skate zine entitled 'SPEED ZINE,' which replaced 'Skate Punk,' an earlier zine that he discontinued, in part, because he "didn't like the name anymore."

Caballero also paints, collects toys and comic books, rides motocross, and is a hot rod enthusiast.

Caballero started a new punk band called Urethane, who has signed to the Cyber Tracks record label. Their debut album, ‘Chasing Horizons’, was released on September 24, 2021.

Personal life
Caballero is of Japanese and Mexican descent, and is a Christian.

Contest history

All contest results are covered in Thrasher Magazine and can be checked at the Thrasher Magazine Archives.

References

Brooke, Michael (1999). Concrete Wave: The History Of Skateboarding. .

External links
Official website
Order video shoutout from Steve CAB

1964 births
Living people
American skateboarders
American sportspeople of Japanese descent
American sportspeople of Mexican descent
Sportspeople from San Jose, California
Musicians from San Jose, California
Artist skateboarders